In calculus, a function series is a series, where the summands are not just real or complex numbers but functions.

Examples
Examples of function series include power series, Laurent series, Fourier series, etc.

Convergence
There exist many types of convergence for a function series, such as uniform convergence, pointwise convergence, almost everywhere convergence, etc. 

The Weierstrass M-test is a useful result in studying convergence of function series.

See also
Function space

References
Chun Wa Wong (2013) Introduction to Mathematical Physics: Methods & Concepts Oxford University Press p.655

Mathematical analysis
Mathematical series